Bangladeshi clubs history of playing in the AFC Cup. Muktijoddha Sangsad KC were the first side to take part since the competition started in 2004. During the 2019 AFC Cup, Dhaka Abahani became the first Bangladeshi club to reach the knockout phase of the tournament.

Who qualifies for Asian club Competitions

AFC Cup Participations 

: Winners
: Runners-Up
: Semifinals 
:Quarterfinals
GS: Group Stage 
QS: Qualifying Stage 
TBA: To be Announced
:  Withdraw
1 Inter-zone play-off semi-finals

Statistics by club

Muktijoddha Sangsad

Results 

1Al Sha'ab Ibb were awarded a 3–0 win as Muktijoddha Sangsad KC did not show up for the match.

Brothers Union

Results

Dhaka Mohammedan

Results

Sheikh Russel

Results

Sheikh Jamal DC

Results

Dhaka Abahani

Results

Saif SC

Results

Bashundhara Kings

Results

Opponents

Head-to-head records against clubs form 31 nations whom they have played to date only in AFC Competitions.

Last Updated on 24 May 2022.

Goal scorers
As of 24 May 2022

See also
 Bangladeshi football clubs in the Asian Club Championship
 Football in Bangladesh

References

Bangladeshi football club records and statistics
Bangladeshi football clubs in international competitions
Football clubs in Bangladesh